Kieran Woolley (born 20 November 2003) is an Australian skateboarder known for his technical abilities and innovative style. 
He grew up riding motorcycles, surfing and skating on the South Coast of New South Wales, Australia. He first competed in skateboarding at the age of 12 and soon won Junior and later Senior Australian Street, Bowl and Park Championships. Woolley is currently ranked #4 in the World Skate male park rankings for the Paris 2024 Olympics.

Recent Competition Results

2021: Tokyo Olympic Games – 5th 

2021: Tampa Am -  1st Bowl Jam 

2021: Red Bull Cold Bowl Invitational, Philadelphia  - 1st
 
2022: Phoenix Am 2nd 

2022: X Games, Chiba, Japan 2nd 

2022: Rune Glifberg Invitational Bowl Jam- Copenhagen Open 1st
 
2022: Summer X Games USA 1st (First Australian to win Gold in Park Skateboarding)

2022 Summer Dew Tour 4th 

2022 Oi Rio Pro 5th 

2023 (2022) World Championships Dubai 4th 

2023, 2022, 2021 Lord of the Bowl - Belco Bowl Jam 

Awards

Kieran was named as a finalist for the Australian Institute of Sport (AIS) Sport Performance Awards (ASPA) Male Athlete of the Year in 2022. 

SLAM Skateboard Magazine - 2022 New Gen Skater of the Year 

Australian Institute of Sport - Scholarship Holder 2020, 2021, 2022, 2023

Sport Australia Hall of Fame (SAHOF) - Scholarship Holder. 
NSW Institute of Sport Finalist Junior Athlete of the Year 

New South Wales Academy of Sport Scholarship holder 2020, 2021, 2022, 2023
 
Illawarra Academy of Sport- Lonestar Athlete of the Year 2018, 2019, 2021
He has trained with the Illawarra Academy of Sport since 2017 and later the NSW Institute of Sport.

2020 Olympics

Woolley competed in the men's park event at the 2020 Tokyo Olympics. He came second in the Preliminary Heats with a better rank than Keegan Palmer. However, an error in the final cost him dearly and he finished fifth in the Final. Full details are in Australia at the 2020 Summer Olympics.

References 

Australian skateboarders
Skateboarders at the 2020 Summer Olympics
2003 births
Living people
Olympic skateboarders of Australia
Sportsmen from New South Wales